Walter Knight Shirley, 11th Earl Ferrers FRIBA (5 June 1864 – 2 February 1937) was a British architect and nobleman.

Born at Christ Church, Oxford, where his father was a professor and canon, Shirley was the second but only surviving son of Rev. Walter Waddington Shirley (d. 1866) and his wife Philippa Knight.

Educated at Winchester College and New College, Oxford, whence he took a B.A. in 1887, Shirley entered the profession of architecture and was articled to Basil Champneys. Part of the Arts and Crafts Movement, he was an active member of the Society for the Protection of Ancient Buildings and the Art Workers Guild, being elected Master in 1918. He designed a large addition to 35 Victoria Road, Kensington in 1896. Shirley's obituary described him as "a most conscientious architect...over-exacting, if anything, in his own work".

On 9 July 1890, Shirley married Mary Jane Moon (d. 10 Jan 1944), daughter of the barrister Robert Moon and the sister of Edward Robert Pacy Moon, by whom he had five children:
Lady Margery Joan Shirley (25 November 1891 – 1 June 1952), married Lancelot Sackville Fletcher on 22 September 1920
Elizabeth Mary Shirley (30 December 1892 – 9 November 1893)
Robert Shirley, 12th Earl Ferrers (1894–1954)
Lady Phillida Shirley (4 November 1896 – 26 December 1985), under the name of Sister Mary Phillida a recluse at the Anglican shrine to Our Lady of Walsingham
Hon. Andrew Shirley (29 December 1900 – 20 June 1958), married Ethel Muriel Lewis on 30 April 1927 and had issue, art historian

In 1912, Shirley succeeded his childless fourth cousin as Earl Ferrers, and largely retired from architecture to tend the family estates. He died at the family seat of Staunton Harold Hall in 1937 aged 72.

References

External links

Mapping the Practice and Profession of Sculpture

1864 births
1937 deaths
Alumni of New College, Oxford
Shirley, Walter Knight
11
People educated at Winchester College
Architects from Oxford
Masters of the Art Worker's Guild
Fellows of the Royal Institute of British Architects